Riccardo Trapella (born 14 February 1968) is an Italian gymnast. He competed in eight events at the 1988 Summer Olympics.

References

1968 births
Living people
Italian male artistic gymnasts
Olympic gymnasts of Italy
Gymnasts at the 1988 Summer Olympics
Place of birth missing (living people)